PeR (Please Explain the Rhythm) is a Latvian pop and beatboxing band formed in 2007. The original line-up was Ralfs Eilands, Emīls Vegners, and Pēteris Upenieks. Vegners left the band in 2007 and was replaced by Edmunds Rasmanis. But when Upelnieks left the trio in 2011, he was not replaced, rendering the band a duo consisting of just Eilands and Rasmanis. After three failed attempts in earlier years to represent Latvia in the Eurovision Song Contest, PeR won the 2013 Dziesma contest and represented the country in the 2013 Contest with the song "Here We Go" and placed last in the second semi-final.

Background

Early years (2007–2008)
The band was founded in 2007, with original members; Ralfs Eilands, Emīls Vegners, and Pēteris Upelnieks. On 21 July 2007, the band first appeared and performed on Dziesma manai paaudzei, the Latvian music festival. After the festival, the band travelled to Moscow, Russia, to compete with other artists on the talent show Minuta Slavy (Minute of Fame), with the band coming in fourth place during voting. The band returned to Latvia where they received an invitation to participate in the annual music event Bildes 2007. This was the last event with the original members.

In 2008, Emīls Vegners left the band and was replaced by Edmunds Rasmanis. The band gained popularity appearing on the first series of the Latvian television station LNT contest Latvijas zelta talanti, the group managed to reach the final, but failed to win. After the contest, the band performed at many events, including the 2009 edition of Muzikālā banka.

Eirodziesma
2009
In 2009, the band with Sabīne Berezina entered the 2009 edition of Eirodziesma, the Latvian national selection for the Eurovision Song Contest 2009, with the song "Bye, Bye". The song qualified from the semi-final in sixth place, but finished ninth in the final.

2010
The band returned to Eirodziesma in 2010, with the song "Like a Mouse", finishing in tenth and last place in the final.

2011–2012
In 2011, the band was reduced to two members when Pēteris Upenieks left the band. They again participated in Eirodziesma in 2012, with "Disco Superfly", qualifying from the semi-final and finishing fifth in the final.

Dziesma and Eurovision Song Contest (2013)
The band entered two songs for Dziesma 2013, "Sad Trumpet" was entered into the first semi-final, and "Here We Go" into the second semi-final. Both songs qualified from their semi-finals to the final. "Sad Trumpet" and "Here We Go" were drawn fourth and twelfth respectively in the final running order, during voting "Here We Go" qualified to the super-final with two other songs. At the close of voting "Here We Go" had received the most votes and won the contest, and thus represented Latvia at the Eurovision Song Contest 2013 in Malmö, Sweden. The song was the opening act in the second semi-final, but failed to qualify for the final, finishing last in the semi final with 13 points.

Ralfs Eilands was one of the five jurors for Latvia in the Eurovision Song Contest 2015 in Vienna, Austria; also the spokesperson for Latvian voting during Eurovision Song Contest 2014 in Copenhagen, Denmark.

PeR have also performed in Riga in the Tall Ships boat race.

Discography

Albums
2012 – PeR

Singles
2009 – "Bye, Bye"
2009 – "Bums"
2010 – "Like a Mouse"
2010 – "Līdzsvarā"
2011 – "Go Get Up"
2011 – "Mazajām Sirsniņām"
2012 – "Disco Superfly"
2013 – "Sad Trumpet"
2013 – "Here We Go"

References

External links

PeR on draugiem.lv

Musical groups established in 2009
Latvian musical groups
Eurovision Song Contest entrants of 2013
Eurovision Song Contest entrants for Latvia